Richmond was a Canadian urban neighbourhood comprising part of the North End of the Halifax Peninsula in Nova Scotia's Halifax Regional Municipality.

History
Formerly a separately incorporated part of Halifax County, the village of Richmond grew north of North Street, the traditional dividing line with the City of Halifax's original North End.  Located on the western shore of The Narrows of Halifax Harbour, Richmond soon industrialized after the Nova Scotia Railway built along the shore to serve the navy dockyard and various shipping piers and warehouses.

Richmond was amalgamated into the City of Halifax during the late 19th century and its traditional boundary was blurred as the area became absorbed into the expanding North End.

Richmond was devastated on December 6, 1917 when the Halifax Explosion levelled much of its structures and waterfront. The rising slope of Fort Needham protected some areas from the immediate effects of the shock wave. The Halifax Relief Commission, formed by an order-in-council on 22 January 1918, was subsequently incorporated and given broader powers as a result of an act passed by the Nova Scotia Legislature. Aside from its mandate to compensate victims of the explosion, the $21,000,000 donated by various governments and the public would be used to rebuild the devastated areas as the commission saw fit. Thomas Adams, a renowned town planner and his assistant, H. L. Seymour were called upon to plan the reconstruction and were later joined by architect George Ross of Montreal. The rebuilt area, formerly called Merkelsfield, is now known as The Hydrostone District because of the use of a stone-faced concrete material known as hydrostone for the exterior building material. Timber and stucco were used for roofing materials. Although most of the work was carried out by the firm of Ross and Macdonald, several local architects were also awarded projects. Most of the work was completed by 1921.

References 

Communities in Halifax, Nova Scotia